Keith Raffel is an American novelist, technology executive, university lecturer, and former United States Senate aide and political candidate.  He is the author of five novels: Dot Dead (2006), Smasher (2009), Drop By Drop: A Thriller (2011), A Fine and Dangerous Season (2012), and Temple Mount (2014).  After graduating from Harvard Law School, Raffel served as counsel to the United States Senate Select Committee on Intelligence during the late 1970s and early 1980s.  He returned to his home state of California in 1982, where he unsuccessfully ran for United States Congress.  Raffel then embarked on business career in the technology sector.  In 1996, he founded UpShot Corporation, a customer relationship management (CRM) software company that was a pioneer in cloud computing and was later acquired by Siebel Systems.  From 2011 to 2013 Raffel served as senior vice president and chief commercial officer at Complete Genomics, a life sciences company that specializes in human genome sequencing and analysis. He is currently a resident scholar and lecturer at Harvard University.

Early life and education
Raffel grew up in Palo Alto, California, and attended Palo Alto High School.  He graduated from Harvard College with a Bachelor of Arts and from Harvard Law School with a Juris Doctor.  He also earned a Master of Letters in modern history from the University of Oxford.

Political career
Raffel served as counsel to the United States Senate Select Committee on Intelligence from 1977 to 1981.  During this time Congress passed the Foreign Intelligence Surveillance Act (1978), the Classified Information Procedures Act (1980), and the Intelligence Oversight Act (1980).  In 1982, Raffel ran for the Democratic Party nomination for the United States House of Representatives seat from California's 12th congressional district, which was vacated by incumbent Republican Pete McCloskey.   Raffel was defeated in the primary election.  The seat was eventually won by Republican Ed Zschau.

Business/academic career
Raffel served in a number of executive roles with ROLM from 1982 to 1989 and with Echelon Corporation from 1989 to 1996.  In 1996, he founded UpShot Corporation, a software company that delivered Internet-based customer relationship management and sales automation tools for businesses.   UpShot was the first company in Silicon Valley to provide cloud computing solutions.  Within two years, UpShot released its first product, and by 2003 the company provided services for small, midsize, and large organizations.  UpShot competed with Salesforce.com for market share among large, Fortune 1000 companies.  In July 2003, Salesforce.com filed a complaint against UpShot in the United States District Court for the Northern District of California, claiming that advertising put out by Raffel's firm had violated state and federal laws pertaining to fair business competition.  Raffel argued that his firm's ads were truthful, and noted that Salesforce.com had been aggressive in its advertising, particularly in targeting Siebel Systems.  He was quoted as saying, "Salesforce suing over an ad is like the person who kills both his parents and then asks for mercy because he's an orphan."

In November 2003, Siebel Systems purchased UpShot for $70 million.  Raffel then worked for Siebel until 2006, when it was purchased by Oracle Corporation.  He remained with Oracle until 2008.  At Siebel, Raffel served as group vice president of the company's OnDemand operation, where he oversaw a series of software upgrades and added features to provide social networking and market segmentation tools to his firm's customers.  In June 2011 Raffel joined Complete Genomics as Senior Vice President and Chief Commercial Officer.  The life sciences company, based in the Mountain View, California, began operations in 2006, and provides sequencing and analysis of human genomic data. He left the company in June 2013 three months after it was purchased by the Chinese company, BGI-Shenzhen. Since September 2017, he has been at Harvard University where he serves as writer-in-residence in Mather House, a fellow at the Office of Career Services, and a lecturer at the Paulson School of Engineering and Applied Sciences. He has co-taught a course on technology policy and ethics for each of the past three academic years.

Writing career
Raffel's first novel, Dot Dead, was published in 2006 by Midnight Ink, an imprint of Llewellyn Worldwide of Woodbury, Minnesota. The murder mystery is set in Silicon Valley, and centers on Ian Michaels, a young technology executive.  Michaels discovers his housekeeper, Gwendolyn Goldberg, dead on his bed when he returns home one day, and is suspected of her murder. The New York Times called Dot Dead "a murder mystery worthy of a Steve Jobs keynote presentation".  Raffel followed up with his second novel in 2009, entitled Smasher, which was also published by Midnight Ink.  Smasher continues the story of Ian Michaels as he defends his company from a potential takeover, investigates the work of his aunt at Stanford University's physics department, and protects his wife—a deputy district attorney—from a mysterious threat.

Raffel's third novel, Drop By Drop: A Thriller, was published in 2011.  The story's main character is Sam Rockman, a history professor at Stanford, who loses his wife in a bombing at San Francisco International Airport.  Rockman reunites with a United States Senator for whom he had worked before graduate school, and is appointed to the Senate's Intelligence Committee to investigate the terrorist attack.

Raffel's fourth novel, A Fine and Dangerous Season, was self-published in September 2012 and republished by Thomas & Mercer, an imprint of Amazon Publishing, in November 2013. The work of historical fiction is set during the Cuban Missile Crisis and is centered upon Nathan Michaels, a salesman for Hewlett-Packard who knew President Kennedy two decades earlier during their time at Stanford.  Kennedy enlists Michaels to use his connections to a KGB agent to communicate with Soviet Premier Nikita Khrushchev and resolve the international crisis.  Reviews of Drop By Drop and A Fine and Dangerous Season have noted Raffel's professional experience in Washington, D.C. and the verisimilitude with which he portrayed the workings of the government in his novels.

Raffel raised the funds to publish and publicize his fifth novel via a Kickstarter campaign where he crowd-sourced comments, edits, and suggestions. Maris Kreizman of Kickstarter commented, "It was the first time I'd come across a project in which an author specifically solicited editorial feedback from backers…. This was a creative way to invite his audience in closer." In November 2014, Raffel’s novel Temple Mount was published. In it, high tech entrepreneur Alex Kalman rushes to his dying grandfather’s bedside and finds himself promising to find the Ark of the Covenant, missing for over 2,500 years. In Israel, Kalman picks up a partner in his quest—archeologist Rivka Golan. Within days they are targeted by a sniper, chased through the streets of Jerusalem by a bulldozer, interrogated by Israeli intelligence, and trapped in a tunnel under Jerusalem’s Temple Mount.

List of works
 Dot Dead (2006), 
 Smasher (2009), 
 Drop By Drop: A Thriller (2011)
 A Fine and Dangerous Season (2012), 
 Temple Mount (2014),

References

External links
 
 

Living people
American businesspeople
American male novelists
American thriller writers
California Democrats
Candidates in the 1982 United States elections
20th-century American politicians
Employees of the United States Senate
Oracle employees
Harvard Law School alumni
Alumni of the University of Oxford
Writers from Palo Alto, California
Harvard College alumni
Year of birth missing (living people)